89 Cubs may refer to:
 1989 Chicago Cubs season - the 1989 baseball season of the Chicago Cubs
 The '89 Cubs - a musical group from Omaha, Nebraska